Michael Erwin (born 10 December 1965) is a former Australian rules footballer who played with Collingwood in the Victorian Football League (VFL). His father Mick Erwin was also a Collingwood footballer and coached the club in 1982.

Erwin, who played his early football at Marcellin College, played three senior games for Collingwood over the 1984 and 1985 seasons. His debut in 1984 came in Collingwood's round 18 win over Richmond, as a replacement for an injured Peter Daicos. The following year he played twice, before losing his spot in the team with a thigh injury.

References

1965 births
Australian rules footballers from Victoria (Australia)
Collingwood Football Club players
Living people
People educated at Marcellin College, Bulleen